Riviera is a 1971–1974 rusted and varnished steel sculpture by Anthony Caro, formerly installed at Olympic Sculpture Park in Seattle, Washington.

References

1974 sculptures
Olympic Sculpture Park
Sculptures by Anthony Caro
Steel sculptures in Washington (state)